Leiocephalus loxogrammus, commonly known as the Rum Cay curlytail lizard and the San Salvador curlytail, is a lizard species in the family of curly-tailed lizard (Leiocephalidae). The species is endemic to The Bahamas and is only known to be found on San Salvador Island and Rum Cay.

Subspecies
Two subspecies have been described for the two different island populations: L. l. loxogrammus on Rum Cay and L. l. parnelli on San Salvador Island.<ref>Schwartz A, Henderson RW (1991). Amphibians and Reptiles of the West Indies: Descriptions, Distributions, and Natural History. Gainesville: University of Florida Press. 714 pp. .</ref>

References

Further reading
Cope ED (1887). "List of the Batrachia and Reptilia of the Bahama Islands". Proceedings of the United States National Museum 10: 436-439. ("Liocephalus [sic] loxogrammus ", new species, pp. 437-438).
Schwartz A, Thomas R (1975). A Check-list of West Indian Amphibians and Reptiles. Carnegie Museum of Natural History Special Publication No. 1. Pittsburgh, Pennsylvania: Carnegie Museum of Natural History. 216 pp. (Leiocephalus loxogrammus'', p. 130).

External links
Bahamas National Trust
Ardastra Gardens, Zoo and Conservation Center

Leiocephalus
Fauna of the Bahamas
Endemic fauna of the Bahamas
Reptiles described in 1887
Taxa named by Edward Drinker Cope